Burning Man is a 2011 Australian drama film written and directed by Jonathan Teplitzky.

Plot
Burning Man tells the story of Tom (Matthew Goode), a British chef in a Bondi restaurant, who seems to have chosen to disobey his boss, and his actions are tolerated by everyone around him. As Tom descends into darkness from a car crash in his Volkswagen, pieces of a different story start to emerge. Every woman around him tries, in different ways, to help Tom put himself back together.

Cast
 Matthew Goode as Tom
 Bojana Novakovic as Sarah
 Essie Davis as Karen
 Rachel Griffiths as Miriam
 Kerry Fox as Sally
 Anthony Hayes as Brian
 Jack Heanly as Oscar
 Kate Beahan as Lesley
 Gia Carides as Carol
 Marta Dusseldorp as Lisa
 Robyn Malcolm as Kathryn

Reception

Fiona Williams of SBS awarded the film four stars out of five, observing that the film is an "experiential kaleidoscope of sex, love, and the numbing nihilism that accompanies a traumatic event." She also notes that "Burning Man manages to bring energy, originality and depth to a storyline that is itself something of a trope: ‘The Cancer Film’."

Accolades

References

External links
 

2011 films
2011 drama films
APRA Award winners
Australian drama films
Films set in Sydney
Films directed by Jonathan Teplitzky
2010s English-language films